A powder room may refer to:

 Powder Room (film), a 2013 film
 A public toilet 
 A toilet (room), a room containing a toilet in a private dwelling, often for guests (U.S.)